The Georgetown Railroad  is a class III short-line railroad headquartered in Georgetown, Texas.

History
The original Georgetown Railroad Company was chartered on May 31, 1878, with a commitment to build a railroad the approximately 10 mile distance between Georgetown and Round Rock.  The first board of directors consisted of Emzy Taylor, Moses E. Steele, Thomas B. Hughes, J. H. Rucker, Duncan G. Smith, and John J. Dimmitt, all of Williamson County, and David Love. The headquarters was in Georgetown.

The proceeds of the first stock offering was about $50,000, and the end of 1878, the GRR had connected Georgetown to Round Rock.  Soon, the railroad found itself in difficult financial straits and was sold in foreclosure on August 5, 1879.  The International-Great Northern Railroad purchased the Georgetown and operations merged with that company in 1882. The branch was operated by the I-GN and its successors until 1959, when it was sold to the new Georgetown Railroad Company.

This company was incorporated on July 25, 1958, and it acquired eight miles of the Georgetown branch of the Missouri Pacific Railroad which was a successor to the I-GN.

On June 3, 1991, the Georgetown Railroad acquired that portion of the Belton Railroad east of Interstate 35 at Belton and began operating this line as its Belton Subdivision.

Operations

The "Granger Branch", a 24.3 mile line from an interchange with Union Pacific at Round Rock, Texas through Georgetown to an interchange with Union Pacific at Granger, Texas (the line was previously owned by Missouri Pacific and Missouri-Kansas-Texas)
The "Belton Branch", a 5.9 mile line from Belton, Texas to an interchange with Union Pacific at Smith, Texas (the line was previously owned by Missouri-Kansas-Texas). It has sat out of service for about a decade.

The Georgetown Railroad primarily handles unit aggregate trains for the Texas Crushed Stone Company's large quarry located west of Georgetown, but it also delivers building materials to the Builders FirstSource lumber yard in Georgetown.

See also

 Georgetown Rail Equipment Company

References

External links
Link to Union Pacific Website with GRR Details
Georgetown Railroad

Texas railroads
Spin-offs of the Missouri Pacific Railroad